European Film Award for Best Editor is an award category in the European Film Awards. The European Film Awards are presented annually by the European Film Academy to recognize excellence in European cinematic achievements. The awards are given in over ten categories of which the most important is the Film of the year. They are restricted to European cinema and European producers, directors, and actors.

The award was first presented in 1991 being received by Giancarla Simoncelli for Ultrà. A set of nominees was presented in 2005 and from 2010 to 2012, since 2013 only a winner is announced without nominees. Though the award was not given from 2006 to 2009, three editors received nominations for the Award of Excellence.

Winners and nominees

1990s

2000s

2010s

2020s

References

External links
 European Film Academy archive

Editor
Awards established in 1991
1991 establishments in Europe